Garden Prairie can mean:
 Garden Prairie, Illinois - a village in the United States
 An alternate name for a prairie garden